The Estadio Emilio Williams Agasse is a football stadium in Choluteca, Honduras.  It has a seating capacity of 8 000 and it host the home games for Lobos UPNFM. in the Honduran Liga Nacional .

History
The stadium was named after businessman Abraham Emilio Williams, who had been recently assassinated in Choluteca.  The stadium was inaugurated on 8 September 2017 and the first two games were played a day after the in a double header where Broncos del Sur F.C. hosted F.C. Municipal Valencia for a Liga de Ascenso encounter, followed by the Honduran Superclásico as the primetime match.

Events

References

Emilio Williams Agasse, Estadio
Sports venues completed in 2017
2017 establishments in Honduras
Choluteca Department